A special election filled the remainder of the term in the United States House of Representatives for Georgia's 5th congressional district in the 116th United States Congress. Incumbent Representative John Lewis, who was diagnosed with pancreatic cancer in December 2019, died on July 17, 2020 during his 17th term.

Background

As established by the Constitution of Georgia, Governor Brian Kemp ordered a special election to fill out the remainder of Lewis's term for September 29, 2020. Since no candidate reached 50% on September 29, there was a special runoff election on December 1.  This meant that the runoff election took place four weeks after the regular election for a full two-year term. The runoff winner would thus serve for just one month covering the holiday season.

On July 20, 2020, the state Democratic Party announced that State Senator Nikema Williams would replace Lewis on the November ballot, which she won with over 300,000 votes (85%). Williams did not run in the special election to serve the remainder of Lewis's term.

Candidates

Democratic Party

Advanced to runoff
 Robert Michael Franklin Jr., former President of Morehouse College (2007–2012) and professor at Emory University
 Kwanza Hall, former Atlanta City Councilman (2006–2017) and 2017 Atlanta mayoral election candidate

Eliminated in blanket primary 
 Barrington Martin II, educator, 2020 candidate in Georgia's 5th congressional district
 Mable Thomas, state representative and former Atlanta City Councilwoman (1997–2003)
 Keisha Waites, former state representative (2012–2017), 2020 candidate in Georgia's 13th congressional district

Declined
 Meria Carstarphen, former Superintendent of Atlanta Public Schools (2014–2020)
 Nikema Williams, state senator and chairwoman of the Georgia Democratic Party (opted to run in the general election instead)

Libertarian Party

Eliminated in blanket primary 
 Chase Oliver, customer service specialist

Independent

Eliminated in blanket primary 
 Steven Muhammad, Community Organizer

General election

Predictions

Results

Runoff

See also
 2020 Georgia (U.S. state) elections

References

External links 
 Robert Michael Frankin Jr. (D) for Congress
 Kwanza Hall (D) for Congress

Georgia 2020 05
Georgia 2020 05
2020 05 Special
Georgia 05 Special
United States House of Representatives 05 Special
United States House of Representatives 2020 05
December 2020 events in the United States